Inga Liljestrom is an Australian  experimental vocalist, composer, producer and performer. Her musical style is broad and crosses many genres, from electronic to rock, folk, country, and avant garde. She also works with film and collage, collating her own ideas into visual representations of her compositions.

Life and career 

Born in Australia of a Scandinavian-born father and an English-born mother, she grew up in Bellingen on the north coast of New South Wales in the midst of an omnipresent nature which inspired her artistic world.

At the age of 10, she and her family joined an alternative religious community in which music played an important role. Then she discovered a passion for singing.

Later, she studied jazz vocals and improvisation at Southern Cross University. During her studies, her work revolves around the jazz singers Billie Holiday, Sarah Vaughan, Nina Simone and Nancy Wilson. At the same time, she also learns the Yoik song from Lapland and studies Spanish-influenced music.

After graduation, she moved to Sydney where she began composing her own songs accompanied by Felicity Wilcox with whom she set up an experimental punk-rock band, Helgrind. However, she continued her solo musical advancement and won a government grant from the Council of the Arts through which she recorded her first self-produced album, Urchin.

She has released five albums commercially and one self-released. She has worked extensively both in Australia and overseas in Europe as both a recording artist and performer of her own music. She is currently signed to world music label Accord Croises in France.

In 2009 she relocated to Paris, France, and recorded 'Black Crow Jane', which resulted in a publishing and record deal with Emergence music, based in France. Her compositions and voice has also contributed to many films and television programs including feature 'Left Ear' by Andrew Wholley; and ABC's Rake series. In the last few years, she has been teaching University students in Europe and Australia as part of Residency programs, creating multi-media shows with art, music and film students.

She has performed and toured as guest singer with numerous groups such as jazz experimental group 'd.i.g' (Directions in Groove) for their album Curveystrasse; with Australian group The Church, for their album El Momento Siguiente; made vocal contributions to "Dust Me Selecta" by Gerling which became a hit song and remixed Gotye's Mixed Blood.

Since 1998, Inga has released 5 albums (with a new one almost completed for release in 2013), one DVD and has performed many shows, including sold-out performances at The Studio, Sydney Opera House; The Vanguard; 505; Sydney and Adelaide festivals; and also festivals in Europe including Czech Republique, Poland, France and more. Liljestrom toured and composed with the Branch Nebula production 'Paradise City', touring South America and regional Australia.

Discography

 Urchin (Self Released 1998)	

4 Stars "Inga Liljestrom’s voice tickles angels’ ears... her sultry voice of yesteryear is the mesmerising centerpiece...raises gooseflesh." (Chloe Sasson, Metro, Sydney Morning Herald, Australia)
 Elk (Groovescooter Records 2005)	

CD of the Week "...dripping in emotion it is nothing short of magic...Phoenix is the stand out track; imagine being tossed around by a storm of strings, bass and drums, all held together by a voice that expresses so much with so little effort. Inga's voice is a fresh sound that is crying to be heard; this album will not disappoint."(Benjamin Chinnock, The Brag Magazine, Australia)

Drenched in a narcotic otherworldliness, it’s as much an interior journey to the deepest extremes of Inga’s musical well – a sort of seductive one-on-one with an inspired mind...the 12 songs are like weather stations in a sea of emotion, to chart a course thru shifting moods and dreamscapes...That unique voice of Liljestrom is what brings it all together. Blessed with a fragile/strong feel that can whisper intimacies even when filling the soundscape with primal cries, it’s a voice that focuses listeners and draws them in. Inga Liljestrom has something sensual and artistic all her own. Highly recommended. (Perry Kilmer, Drum Media Magazine, Australia)
 Sprawling Fawns (Groovescooter /da dAdA 2006)	
 Quiet Music for Quiet People (Vitamin Records 2006)	
 Radjur - DVD (Groovescooter /da dAdA 2008)	
 Urchin 2010 (Groovescooter /da dAdA 2010) [reissue]	

"She manages to balance her dark and emotive songwriting with an orchestral depth, with neither dominating the other… In a league of her own…" 5/5 (Hamish Ta-Me, Crema Magazine, Australia)
 Black Crow Jane (Emergent/Groovescooter Records 2011)	

"Something truly happens when beautiful voices of the north attack folk music...Inga Liljestrom masters a sense of space and ambience, treacherously calm. The ettiquette is strange, with a distant legacy of Kate Bush on Black Crow Jane, alternating between perfect nursery rhymes for adults and unnerving rock epics. [She]… has appropriated some American heritage, but it is barely recognisable here, under an assault of fire and ice. A small marvel of poetry who caresses as much as she cuts." (Journal Ventrilo, France)

"…an undeniable mastery in writing, composition, production, arrangements, visual - a breath and power that does not evaporate, as in many others….Black Crow Jane alternating climates, hot, cold, hit, appeased (skeletal lament Drowning Song, rock and thick skinned Mascara Black, Bloodstain, almost folk delicacy Wishing Bone Hands, Wildest Horse, or …) Between rock and cabaret Gothic Inga Liljeström with her ominous incantations, she reminds us that before her, another Australian came to Europe to impose his unique vision under high influence of tortured crooner: Nick Cave."(Telerama, Hugo Cassavetti, France)
 Songs of Sorrow for the Hollow of His Heart (album) (Groovescooter Records 2012–13)
 Two Dangers (album) (Groovescooter Records 2014)

Citations and references

Living people
Australian singer-songwriters
Year of birth missing (living people)
Australian women singer-songwriters